An existential graph is a type of diagrammatic or visual notation for logical expressions, proposed by Charles Sanders Peirce, who wrote on graphical logic as early as 1882, and continued to develop the method until his death in 1914.

The graphs
Peirce proposed three systems of existential graphs:
 alpha, isomorphic to sentential logic and the two-element Boolean algebra;
 beta, isomorphic to first-order logic with identity, with all formulas closed;
 gamma, (nearly) isomorphic to normal modal logic.
Alpha nests in beta and gamma. Beta does not nest in gamma, quantified modal logic being more general than put forth by Peirce.

Alpha

The syntax is:
The blank page;
Single letters or phrases written anywhere on the page;
Any graph may be enclosed by a simple closed curve called a cut or sep. A cut can be empty. Cuts can nest and concatenate at will, but must never intersect.
Any well-formed part of a graph is a subgraph.

The semantics are:
The blank page denotes Truth;
Letters, phrases, subgraphs, and entire graphs may be True or False;
To enclose a subgraph with a cut is equivalent to logical negation or Boolean complementation. Hence an empty cut denotes False;
All subgraphs within a given cut are tacitly conjoined.
Hence the alpha graphs are a minimalist notation for sentential logic, grounded in the expressive adequacy of And and Not. The alpha graphs constitute a radical simplification of the two-element Boolean algebra and the truth functors.

The depth of an object is the number of cuts that enclose it.

Rules of inference:
Insertion - Any subgraph may be inserted into an odd numbered depth.
Erasure - Any subgraph in an even numbered depth may be erased.

Rules of equivalence:
Double cut - A pair of cuts with nothing between them may be drawn around any subgraph. Likewise two nested cuts with nothing between them may be erased. This rule is equivalent to Boolean involution.
Iteration/Deiteration – To understand this rule, it is best to view a graph as a tree structure having nodes and ancestors. Any subgraph P in node n may be copied into any node depending on n. Likewise, any subgraph P in node n may be erased if there exists a copy of P in some node ancestral to n (i.e., some node on which n depends). For an equivalent rule in an algebraic context, see C2 in Laws of Form.

A proof manipulates a graph by a series of steps, with each step justified by one of the above rules. If a graph can be reduced by steps to the blank page or an empty cut, it is what is now called a tautology (or the complement thereof). Graphs that cannot be simplified beyond a certain point are analogues of the satisfiable formulas of first-order logic.

Beta
Peirce notated predicates using intuitive English phrases; the standard notation of contemporary logic, capital Latin letters, may also be employed. A dot asserts the existence of some individual in the domain of discourse. Multiple instances of the same object are linked by a line, called the "line of identity". There are no literal variables or quantifiers in the sense of first-order logic. A line of identity connecting two or more predicates can be read as asserting that the predicates share a common variable. The presence of lines of identity requires modifying the alpha rules of Equivalence.

The beta graphs can be read as a system in which all formula are to be taken as closed, because all variables are implicitly quantified. If the "shallowest" part of a line of identity has even (odd) depth, the associated variable is tacitly existentially (universally) quantified. 

Zeman (1964) was the first to note that the beta graphs are isomorphic to first-order logic with equality (also see Zeman 1967). However, the secondary literature, especially Roberts (1973) and Shin (2002), does not agree on just how this is so. Peirce's writings do not address this question, because first-order logic was first clearly articulated only some years after his death, in the 1928 first edition of David Hilbert and Wilhelm Ackermann's Principles of Mathematical Logic.

Gamma
Add to the syntax of alpha a second kind of simple closed curve, written using a dashed rather than a solid line. Peirce proposed rules for this second style of cut, which can be read as the primitive unary operator of modal logic.

Zeman (1964) was the first to note that straightforward emendations of the gamma graph rules yield the well-known modal logics S4 and S5. Hence the gamma graphs can be read as a peculiar form of normal modal logic. This finding of Zeman's has gone unremarked to this day, but is nonetheless included here as a point of interest.

Peirce's role
The existential graphs are a curious offspring of Peirce the logician/mathematician with Peirce the founder of a major strand of semiotics. Peirce's graphical logic is but one of his many accomplishments in logic and mathematics. In a series of papers beginning in 1867, and culminating with his classic paper in the 1885 American Journal of Mathematics, Peirce developed much of the two-element Boolean algebra, propositional calculus, quantification and the predicate calculus, and some rudimentary set theory. Model theorists consider Peirce the first of their kind. He also extended De Morgan's relation algebra. He stopped short of metalogic (which eluded even Principia Mathematica).

But Peirce's evolving semiotic theory led him to doubt the value of logic formulated using conventional linear notation, and to prefer that logic and mathematics be notated in two (or even three) dimensions. His work went beyond Euler's diagrams and Venn's 1880 revision thereof. Frege's 1879 Begriffsschrift also employed a two-dimensional notation for logic, but one very different from Peirce's.

Peirce's first published paper on graphical logic (reprinted in Vol. 3 of his Collected Papers) proposed a system dual (in effect) to the alpha existential graphs, called the entitative graphs. He very soon abandoned this formalism in favor of the existential graphs.  In 1911 Victoria, Lady Welby showed the existential graphs to C. K. Ogden who felt they could usefully be combined with Welby's thoughts in a "less abstruse form." Otherwise they attracted little attention during his life and were invariably denigrated or ignored after his death, until the PhD theses by Roberts (1964) and Zeman (1964).

See also
 Ampheck
 Conceptual graph
 Entitative graph
 Logical graph

References

Further reading

Primary literature
1931–1935 & 1958. The Collected Papers of Charles Sanders Peirce. Volume 4, Book II: "Existential Graphs", consists of paragraphs 347–584. A discussion also begins in paragraph 617.
Paragraphs 347–349 (II.1.1. "Logical Diagram")—Peirce's definition "Logical Diagram (or Graph)" in Baldwin's Dictionary of Philosophy and Psychology (1902),  v. 2, p. 28. Classics in the History of Psychology Eprint.
Paragraphs 350–371 (II.1.2. "Of Euler's Diagrams")—from  "Graphs" (manuscript 479) c. 1903.
Paragraphs 372–584 Eprint.
Paragraphs 372–393 (II.2. "Symbolic Logic")—Peirce's part of "Symbolic Logic" in Baldwin's Dictionary of Philosophy and Psychology (1902)  v. 2, pp. 645–650, beginning (near second column's top) with "If symbolic logic be defined...". Paragraph 393 (Baldwin's DPP2 p. 650) is by Peirce and Christine Ladd-Franklin ("C.S.P., C.L.F.").
Paragraphs 394–417 (II.3. "Existential Graphs")—from Peirce's pamphlet A Syllabus of Certain Topics of Logic, pp. 15–23, Alfred Mudge & Son, Boston (1903).
Paragraphs 418–509 (II.4. "On Existential Graphs, Euler's Diagrams, and Logical Algebra")—from "Logical Tracts, No. 2" (manuscript 492), c. 1903.
Paragraphs 510–529 (II.5. "The Gamma Part of Existential Graphs")—from "Lowell Lectures of 1903," Lecture IV (manuscript 467).
Paragraphs 530–572 (II.6.)—"Prolegomena To an Apology For Pragmaticism" (1906), The Monist, v. XVI, n. 4, pp. 492-546. Corrections (1907) in The Monist v. XVII, p. 160. 
Paragraphs 573–584 (II.7. "An Improvement on the Gamma Graphs")—from "For the National Academy of Science, 1906 April Meeting in Washington" (manuscript 490).
Paragraphs 617–623 (at least) (in Book III, Ch. 2, §2, paragraphs 594–642)—from "Some Amazing Mazes: Explanation of Curiosity the First", The Monist, v. XVIII, 1908,  n. 3, pp. 416-464, see starting p. 440.
1992. "Lecture Three: The Logic of Relatives", Reasoning and the Logic of Things, pp. 146–164. Ketner, Kenneth Laine (editing and introduction), and Hilary Putnam (commentary). Harvard University Press. Peirce's 1898 lectures in Cambridge, Massachusetts.
1977, 2001. Semiotic and Significs: The Correspondence between C.S. Peirce and Victoria Lady Welby. Hardwick, C.S., ed. Lubbock TX: Texas Tech University Press. 2nd edition 2001.
A transcription of Peirce's MS 514 (1909), edited with commentary by John Sowa.

Currently, the chronological critical edition of Peirce's works, the Writings, extends only to 1892. Much of Peirce's work on logical graphs consists of manuscripts written after that date and still unpublished. Hence our understanding of Peirce's graphical logic is likely to change as the remaining 23 volumes of the chronological edition appear.

Secondary literature
 Hammer, Eric M. (1998), "Semantics for Existential Graphs," Journal of Philosophical Logic 27: 489–503.
 Ketner, Kenneth Laine
(1981), "The Best Example of Semiosis and Its Use in Teaching Semiotics", American Journal of Semiotics v. I, n. 1–2, pp. 47–83. Article is an introduction to existential graphs.
(1990), Elements of Logic: An Introduction to Peirce's Existential Graphs, Texas Tech University Press, Lubbock, TX, 99 pages, spiral-bound.
 Queiroz, João & Stjernfelt, Frederik 
 (2011), "Diagrammatical Reasoning and Peircean Logic Representation", Semiotica vol. 186 (1/4). (Special issue on Peirce's diagrammatic logic.) 
 Roberts, Don D.
(1964), "Existential Graphs and Natural Deduction" in Moore, E. C., and Robin, R. S., eds., Studies in the Philosophy of C. S. Peirce, 2nd series. Amherst MA: University of Massachusetts Press. The first publication to show any sympathy and understanding for Peirce's graphical logic.
(1973). The Existential Graphs of C.S. Peirce. John Benjamins. An outgrowth of his 1963 thesis.
 Shin, Sun-Joo (2002), The Iconic Logic of Peirce's Graphs. MIT Press.
 Zalamea, Fernando. Peirce's Logic of Continuity. Docent Press, Boston MA. 2012. ISBN 9 780983 700494.
Part II:  Peirce's Existential Graphs, pp. 76-162. 
 Zeman, J. J.
(1964), The Graphical Logic of C.S. Peirce. Unpublished Ph.D. thesis submitted to the University of Chicago.
(1967), "A System of Implicit Quantification," Journal of Symbolic Logic 32: 480–504.

External links
 Stanford Encyclopedia of Philosophy: Peirce's Logic by Sun-Joo Shin and Eric Hammer.
 Dau, Frithjof, Peirce's Existential Graphs --- Readings and Links. An annotated bibliography on the existential graphs.
 Gottschall, Christian, Proof Builder  — Java applet for deriving Alpha graphs.
 Liu, Xin-Wen, "The literature of C.S. Peirce’s Existential Graphs" (via Wayback Machine), Institute of Philosophy, Chinese Academy of Social Sciences, Beijing, PRC.
  (NB. Existential graphs and conceptual graphs.)
 Van Heuveln, Bram, "Existential Graphs." Dept. of Cognitive Science, Rensselaer Polytechnic Institute.  Alpha only.
 Zeman, Jay J., "Existential Graphs". With four online papers by Peirce.

Logic
Logical calculi
Philosophical logic
History of logic
History of mathematics
Charles Sanders Peirce